Brothers is an album by American blues singer-songwriter and instrumentalist Taj Mahal. It was recorded in August 1976 at Conway Recorders Co. in Hollywood and released the following year by Warner Bros. Records. It is the soundtrack to the 1977 film Brothers, with songs that music critic Richie Unterberger described as being "in the mode that Mahal was usually immersed in during the mid-1970s: bluesy, low-key tunes with a lot of Caribbean influence, particularly in the steel drums."

Track listing

 "Love Theme in the Key of D"
 "Funky Butt"
 "Brother's Doin' Time"
 "Night Rider"
 "Free the Brothers"
 "Sentidos Dulce (Sweet Feelings)"
 "Funeral March"
 "Malcolm's Song"
 "David and Angela"

Personnel 
Credits are adapted from AllMusic.

 Rudy Costa – Arranger, Bass, Clarinet, Flute, Flute (Alto), Kalimba, Musician, Sax (Alto), Sax (Soprano), Shekere, Vocals (Background), Wind
 Kwasi "Rocky" Dzidzornu – Arranger, Congas, Musician, Percussion, Vocals (Background)
 Ray Fitzpatrick – Arranger, Bass, Guitar, Keyboards, Musician, Vocals, Vocals (Background)
 Robert Greenidge – Arranger, Drums, Drums (Steel), Musician, Percussion, Vocals, Vocals (Background)
 Claudia Lennear – Vocals, Vocals (Background)
 Taj Mahal – 	Arranger, Banjo, Composer, Guitar, Harmonica, Musician, National Steel Guitar, Performer, Piano, Piano (Electric), Primary Artist, Producer, Vocals
 Larry McDonald – Arranger, Congas, Keyboards, Musician, Percussion, Vocals (Background)
 Alison Mills – Vocals, Vocals (Background)
 Kester Smith – Arranger, Musician, Percussion, Trap Kit, Vocals (Background)

References

External links 
 

1977 soundtrack albums
Taj Mahal (musician) soundtracks
Drama film soundtracks
Warner Records soundtracks